Bolívar is one of the 20 municipalities of the state of Trujillo, Venezuela. The municipality occupies an area of 208 km2 with a population of 15,285 inhabitants according to the 2011 census.

Parishes
The municipality consists of the following three parishes:

 Cheregüé
 Granados
 Sabana Grande

References

Municipalities of Trujillo (state)